Nigadoo is an unincorporated community in Gloucester County, New Brunswick, Canada. It held village status prior to 2023. Nigadoo is located at the mouth of the Nigadoo River on Nepisiguit Bay, 15 km northwest of Bathurst and adjacent to Beresford.

In the Mi'gmaq language "nigadoo" or "Mimoogwodoo" roughly translates as "place to hide".

History

The Name Nigadoo, comes from the old Mi’gmaq word “Mimoogwodoo” meaning “the hiding place”. Long before Samuel de Champlain, John Cabot or Nicolas Denys charted the Chaleur Region it was inhabited by the Mi’gmaq People.

The legend on how Nigadoo got its name goes back to those times before European settlers came. Historically, is known that the Mi’gmaq people and the Iroquois (Mohawk) people were sometimes at war with each other, as their territories bordered each other around the area now known as Edmundston.

It was during one of these wars or conflicts that it was said that a hundred Iroquois canoes were seen coming over the cape, what is known as Gespe'g "Gespe’g" meaning "end of the world", or "where the world ends".

The Mohawk were on a mission to invade the Mi’gmaq people along the Bay of Chaleur which was actually called (Mowebâktabāāk) meaning "The Biggest Bay". Little did the Mohawk know, that there were Mi’gmaq scouts and runners who saw the fleet of canoes coming.

The Mi’gmaq in the Gespe’g sent runners or messengers ahead of the fleet to warn each village that the Mohawk warriors were coming. By the time the message was relayed all the way to Nepisiguit, “Oinpegitjoig ” the Mi’gmaq warriors had enough time to gather an offensive and they chose the mouth of the Nigadoo river to hide their canoes to ambush the Mohawk.

The mouth of the Nigadoo River was a strategic location due to the way the River is hidden from the Bay, as it flows around a sand bar that can still be seen to this day.

As the Mohawk fleet of canoes made their way down along the coast, they were surprised and ambushed by the Mi’gmaq warriors who defeated the invaders. It was after the success of this battle that the Mi’gmaq forever called this place "Mimoogwodoo"”.

Over time, as French Acadian settlers came to this place, they asked their friends and neighbors the Mi’gmaq people what this meant. It is speculated that the French settlers could not properly pronounce Mimoogwodoo (mim-moo-gwah-doo) and over time it came to be known as Nigadoo.

On 1 January 2023, Nigadoo amalgamated with Beresford, Petit-Rocher, Pointe-Verte, and all or part of ten local service districts to form the new town of Belle-Baie. The community's name remains in official use.

Demographics

Language

Notable people

See also
List of communities in New Brunswick

References

Communities in Gloucester County, New Brunswick
Populated coastal places in Canada
Former villages in New Brunswick